Stratford-upon-Avon Parkway is a railway station located on the northern outskirts of Stratford-upon-Avon in Warwickshire, England. It is on the North Warwickshire Line, adjacent to the A46.

The station is served by West Midlands Railway and Chiltern Railways, and consists of two platforms on either side of the track, which are linked by a DDA compliant footbridge with ramps. It makes use of the Park and Ride facilities at Bishopton, which can occupy up to 725 vehicles.

History
The station was intended to open in December 2013, however it was completed several months ahead of schedule and opened on 19 May 2013. Construction work commenced on 17 October 2012.

It was projected that development of the station would cost £8.8 million. In July 2011, the Department for Transport agreed to contribute £5 million under the Local Sustainable Transport Fund. In September 2011, Warwickshire County Council agreed to contribute £1.8 million, and later announced that Mott MacDonald had been appointed to produce the GRIP 4 outline design of the parkway station.

Facilities
There is a ticket machine outside the entrance to platform 1 which accepts card payments only - cash and voucher payments can be made to the senior conductor on the train.

Cycle parking is available.

Step free access is available between the platforms via the ramp. The station is unstaffed. Information is available from help points located on both platforms and from the senior conductor on the train.

Services

West Midlands Railway 

Stratford-upon-Avon Parkway is served by two trains per hour, to  via  northbound and to  along the North Warwickshire Line.

On Sundays there is an hourly service to  via  and  northbound and to  southbound. Services only run between 09:00 and 19:45. A more expensive ticket is also available which allows travel via .

Chiltern Railways 

Sunday services only run from 09:40 with the final departure at 20:40.

References

External links

Railway stations in Warwickshire
Railway stations opened by Network Rail
Railway stations in Great Britain opened in 2013
Railway stations served by Chiltern Railways
Railway stations served by West Midlands Trains
Stratford-upon-Avon